World Wide Wargames, or 3W, was a wargame company founded in 1977 (as  UKW, UK Wargamer) by Keith Poulter.

History
3W Inc, also known as World Wide Wargames, was a wargame company that began publishing in 1977. Originally launched in England, the company moved later to California. In addition to producing boxed wargames, 3W published the magazine The Wargamer.

TSR published the magazine Strategy & Tactics from 1983 – 1987 and then sold the rights to 3W, who published the magazine from #112 (June, 1987) to #139; after 3W's Keith Poulter got out of the business, Strategy & Tactics was sold to Decision Games.

Diverse Talents, Inc., the publishers of Space Gamer/Fantasy Gamer, Fire and Movement, and Battleplan magazines, was bought by World Wide Wargames, Inc. on June 1, 1988. Hobbyist magazine publisher Diverse Talents Inc. (DTI) published a third iteration of Space Gamer, and after that ownership of DTI passed on to 3W who started publication with Space Gamer/Fantasy Gamer #83 (1988) as part of a general push by 3W into the RPG industry. Besides Space Gamer they published several licensed adventures, such as City of Angels (1989) for Twilight: 2000, The Liftwood Conspiracy (1989) for Space: 1889 and Operation Overlord (1989) for Traveller: 2300.  According to Shannon Appelcline, "Under the 3W ownership, the quality of the Space Gamer magazines improved but they still looked somewhat dated. 3W decided to resolve this problem following the release of Space Gamer/Fantasy Gamer #85 (January/February, 1989). Afterward they 'rebooted' the magazine. Space Gamer Vol. II, No. 1 (July/August, 1989) featured a much more professional cover and somewhat improved interior contents. Unfortunately the new Space Gamer only lasted through Vol. II, No. 2 (October/November, 1989). In that last issue, the editor rather angrily decried White Wolf Magazine who had said that they were 'the only independent magazine left in the market'. But, for all purposes that statement was largely true. Though considerably improved from its worst DTI days, the times of Space Gamer influencing the industry were over." 3W got out of the RPG business in late 1989, as part of a general sell-off resulting from some failed expansions in the late 1980s. Thereafter ownership of Space Gamer moved on to Future Combat Simulations, who put out a single issue, Space Gamer #88 (March/April, 1990).

After that, the company also took charges of the magazine Moves for several years before selling to Decision Games. The company was known to be extremely prolific and to produce simple games, with a lot of scenarios available in each game, and always at a reasonable price. They also published the magazine Schwerpunkt.  The company closed in 1995.

List of games published
 Bloody Buna (The Wargamer #9, 1972)
 ASG Baseball (1973)
 Ancients (1986)
  Hitler's Last Gamble (1989)
 Light Division (1989)
 Modern Naval Battles (1989)
 Tomorrow the World (1989)
 ''Modern Naval Battles II: The Campaign Game (1990)

References

See also
List of game manufacturers

Wargame companies
Publishing companies established in 1977